Eugen Dido Kvaternik (29 March 1910 – 10 March 1962) was a Croatian Ustaše General-Lieutenant and the Chief of the Internal Security Service in the Independent State of Croatia,  during World War II.

Life
Eugen Dido Kvaternik was the son of Slavko Kvaternik, a general in the Independent State of Croatia army and a member of the Ustaše, and Olga Frank, daughter of Josip Frank, a Catholic convert whose parents were Jewish. 

He instituted a regime of terror against Serbs, Jews, Gypsies and other "enemies of the State". In 1943, after a falling-out with Pavelić, the leader of the Independent State of Croatia, he and his father, Slavko, the Croatian Minister of War, went into exile in Slovakia, and after the war fled to Argentina. From Argentina, he directed activities against Josip Broz Tito. He reorganized Ustaše supporters and continued to publish actively. Yugoslavia's multiple extradition requests were all turned down, and Kvaternik was never tried. Dido Kvaternik died in a car crash in Río Cuarto, Argentina in 1962.

Family
Kvaternik met Marija Cvitković in 1941; the two married on 10 January 1942. The couple had three children: Slavko, Davor and Olga. Slavko later became a professor of political sciences in Argentina, and Davor became a cardiologist in Boston, Massachusetts. Dido and Olga both died in a car accident on 10 March 1962.

References

Bibliography

External links
 Eugen Dido Kvaternik profile , jusp-jasenovac.hr; accessed 28 October 2015. 

1910 births
1962 deaths
Military personnel from Zagreb
Croatian fascists
Croatian irredentism
Croatian people of Jewish descent
Croatian people of German descent
People from the Kingdom of Croatia-Slavonia
Croatian collaborators with Nazi Germany
Croatian collaborators with Fascist Italy
Ustaše
Croatian military personnel of World War II
Road incident deaths in Argentina
Holocaust perpetrators in Yugoslavia
Genocide of Serbs in the Independent State of Croatia perpetrators
Romani genocide perpetrators
Yugoslav emigrants to Argentina